Irina Nurislamova is a currently a judge of the Arbitration Court of the Republic of Bashkortostan, who became well-known in Bashneft case.

Biography 
At least from 2006, she was a judge of the magistrates' court for the Arkhangelsky district of Bashkortostan, where she mostly considered administrative cases.

Presumably, she had worked as a lawyer in Bashkortostan before that.

She was appointed to this position in October 2011.

The biggest lawsuits tried by I. Nurislamova as a judge of the Arbitration Court of the Republic of Bashkortostan are as follows:

Bashneft Case 
Bashneft Case is a corporate conflict between the state-owned company Rosneft and the privately owned Russian company Sistema PJSFC. It is one of the most controversial corporate legal cases in the history of modern Russia.

On 15 May 2017, the Arbitration Court of Bashkortostan registered a RUB 106.6bn claim filed by Rosneft and Bashneft against Sistema, a preliminary hearing of the case was scheduled for 6 June, Irina Nurislamova was appointed as a judge for the case.

On 27 June, the Arbitration Court of Bashkortostan held the first hearing of the claim on the merits, during which it dismissed Sistema's motion to bring Rosimushchestvo to the case as a third party and scheduled the next hearing for 12 July. The court also ordered Sistema to produce evidence of the absence of losses from the restructuring of Bashneft and evidence of a positive economic effect from the restructuring, which, as noted by Sistema's lawyers in their  objection, runs counter to the Supreme Court's explanation and the existing judicial practice, according to which “the 'burden of proof' lies with the claimants”.

On 19 July, after lodging complaints with a number of authorities, Sistema moved for judge recusal in the Rosneft case.

References 

Russian judges
Russian women judges
21st-century judges
21st-century Russian people
Living people
Year of birth missing (living people)
21st-century women judges